Timothy is a masculine name. It comes from the Greek name  (Timόtheos) meaning "honouring God", "in God's honour", or "honoured by God". Timothy (and its variations) is a common name in several countries.

People

Given name
 Timothy (given name), including a list of people with the name
 Tim (given name)
 Timmy
 Timo
 Timotheus
 Timothée

Surname 
 Christopher Timothy (born 1940), Welsh actor.
 Miriam Timothy (1879–1950), British harpist.
 Nick Timothy (born 1980), British political adviser.
Timothy O’Hara (born 1973)MMA cage fighter,28 amateur fights won before the age of 22.

Mononym 
 Saint Timothy, a companion and co-worker of Paul the Apostle
 Timothy I (Nestorian patriarch)

Education 
 Timothy Christian School (Illinois), a school system in Elmhurst, Illinois
 Timothy Christian School (New Jersey), a school in Piscataway, New Jersey

Arts and entertainment 
 "Timothy" (song), a 1970 song by The Buoys
 Timothy Goes to School, a Canadian-Chinese children's animated series
 Timothy (TV film), a 2014 Australian television comedy
 Timothy Turtle, a 1946 picture book by Al Graham
 The Adventures of Timothy Pilgrim, a 1975 Canadian children's television program

Places 
 Timothy, Tennessee, an unincorporated town in Overton County, Tennessee
 Chief Timothy State Park, a former state park in Asotin County, Washington

Other uses 
 Timothy-grass, a type of grass
 Timothy (tortoise), a tortoise in the UK
 First Timothy and Second Timothy, Pauline epistles

See also 
 
 Murder of Timothy Brenton, an anti-police crime in Seattle perpetrated by Christopher Monfort
 Tim (disambiguation)
 Timoti (disambiguation)
 Timati (born 1983), a Russian recording artist and entrepreneur
 Tymoshenko, a Ukrainian surname derived from the name Timothy
 Acts of Timothy, an Apocryphal work regarding Saint Timothy